The United States Mission to the United Nations (USUN) serves as the United States' delegation to the United Nations. USUN is responsible for carrying out the nation's participation in the world body. In 1947, the United States Mission was created by an act of Congress to assist the President and the Department of State in conducting United States policy at the United Nations. Since that time, USUN has served a vital role as the Department of State's UN branch. Today, USUN has approximately 150 people on staff who serve to represent the United States’ political, economic and social, legal, military, public diplomacy, and management interests at the United Nations.

USUN is divided into the following sections: Executive; Washington; Political; Management and Reform; Economic and Social; Legal; Military Staff; Public Affairs; Host Country; Management; and Security.

The United States Mission to the United Nations is located at 799 United Nations Plaza (between E. 44th and E. 45th on First Ave) across the street from United Nations Headquarters.

Leadership
There are several major leadership roles in the U.S. Mission. The primary role, United States Ambassador to the United Nations, is the leader of the U.S. Mission to the United Nations.  The position is more formally known by the exact title:
Permanent Representative of the United States of America to the United Nations, with the rank and status of Ambassador Extraordinary and Plenipotentiary, and Representative of the United States of America in the Security Council of the United Nations.
The position is also known as simply the U.S. Permanent Representative, or "Perm Rep", to the United Nations.

The U.S. permanent representative, currently Linda Thomas-Greenfield, is charged with representing the United States on the UN Security Council and during almost all plenary meetings of the General Assembly, except in the rare situation in which a more senior officer of the United States (such as the U.S. Secretary of State or the President of the United States) is present. Like all United States ambassadors, the U.S. Permanent Representative must be nominated by the U.S. president and confirmed by the Senate.

Many prominent U.S. politicians and diplomats have held the post, including Henry Cabot Lodge, Jr., Adlai Stevenson, George H. W. Bush, Daniel Patrick Moynihan, Dr. Jeane Kirkpatrick, Richard Holbrooke, Dr. Madeleine Albright, Bill Richardson and John Danforth.

It was a cabinet-level position under the Clinton administration and the Obama administration, but no longer held that status under the Trump administration. It was returned to this position under the Biden Administration. It was not a cabinet-level position under the George W. Bush administration (from 2001 to 2009).

Additionally, there are four additional Representatives appointed by the President of the United States to serve on the United Nations General Assembly, two acting as Congressional Representatives to the United Nations and two Non-Congressional members. The Biden Administration has named Tom Carnahan and Sim Farar as Representatives of the United States to the General Assembly of the United Nations who are not members of Congress.

The other leadership roles are also known as UN ambassadors, but with specific titles as related to which offices of the UN they handle.

Congressional Representatives to the United Nations
The U.S. president also appoints two members of Congress. Members are selected by the United States House of Representatives and/or United States Senate – one Democrat and one Republican from each chamber – as Congressional Representatives to the United Nations General Assembly. The position is regulated by Section 2(a) of the United Nations Participation Act (UNPA), which stipulates that the President can appoint no more than five members of Congress to the General Assembly with the advice and consent of the Senate and that members appointed to the Assembly can not be compensated for their service in the Assembly. The duties of Congressional Representatives are not specified by the UNPA, but they generally act as observers in the committee proceedings and formal gatherings of UN General Assembly members and heads of state. 
As outlined in UNPA, the President, with the advice and consent of the Senate, may designate congressional representatives.

Committee selection
Both the House Foreign Affairs Committee (HFAC) and Senate Foreign Relations Committee (SFRC), have at different times, documented procedures for selecting congressional representatives. In practice, the process appears to be informal and has varied over time depending on the priorities and preferences of committee leadership.

 House of Representatives: HFAC does not appear to have a formal process for selecting congressional representatives to the General Assembly. Based on past practice, it has assigned one Member from each political party on the basis of seniority, starting with those who have not served as representatives; however, in recent years, HFAC members have increasingly selected participants based on the Member’s level of interest in U.N.-related issues and availability to attend the session.

 Senate: Similar to the House, SFRC also does not appear to have a formal process for selecting congressional representatives to the Assembly. In practice, the chairperson and ranking member select the representatives, who are usually chosen from among SFRC members. Similar to the House, congressional representatives from the Senate appear to be selected based on their interest in U.N. issues and availability.

The Senate Foreign Relations Committee has developed a policy of not holding hearings for temporary or part-time positions, including General Assembly representatives. Instead, both the HFAC and SFRC have annually provided the President with their choices, who are then nominated by the President and confirmed by the vote of the full Senate.

The current Congressional Representatives to the Seventy-sixth session of the United Nations General Assembly are Congresswoman Barbara Lee (D-CA) and Congressman French Hill (R-AR)

Building
The new building housing the United States Mission to the United Nations, at First Avenue and East 45th Street in Turtle Bay, Manhattan, was dedicated on March 29, 2011. The lead architect was Charles Gwathmey of Gwathmey Siegel & Associates Architects who died in 2009, approximately two years before the structure was completed. Former U.S. Permanent Representative Susan Rice thanked Gwathmey in her remarks at the dedication ceremony.

See also

 Member states of the United Nations
 United Kingdom Mission to the United Nations
 Diplomatic Security Service
 Senior Foreign Service

References

External links

 Official Website
 - Ambassador Rice's remarks at the dedication of the building

 
United States
United Nations
Diplomatic missions in Manhattan
1947 establishments in the United States
1947 establishments in New York City
United States and the United Nations